Kincardine and Western Aberdeenshire was a Scottish constituency of the House of Commons of the Parliament of the United Kingdom from 1918 until 1950.

Boundaries

In 1868, the constituency of Aberdeenshire was divided into Aberdeenshire Eastern and Aberdeenshire Western divisions. These continued as constituencies until 1918, when the county of Aberdeenshire and the county of Kincardineshire were treated as if a single county for parliamentary representation purposes, with the area of the former Kincardineshire and Aberdeenshire constituencies being divided into three new constituencies, Aberdeen and Kincardine East, Aberdeen and Kincardine Central and Kincardine and Aberdeenshire West. In 1950 the Kincardineshire and Aberdeenshire counties were separated again, and a new boundary divided the Aberdeenshire area into East Aberdeenshire and West Aberdeenshire.

From 1918 the constituency consisted of "The county of Kincardine, inclusive of all burghs situated therein except the burgh of Inverbervie and that portion of the county of the city of Aberdeen which is situated within the said county of Kincardine, together with the county districts of Alford and Deeside, inclusive of all burghs situated therein."

Members of Parliament

Election results

Elections in the 1910s

Elections in the 1920s

Elections in the 1930s

Election in the 1940s

See also 
 Former United Kingdom Parliament constituencies

References 

Historic parliamentary constituencies in Scotland (Westminster)
History of Aberdeenshire
Constituencies of the Parliament of the United Kingdom established in 1918
Constituencies of the Parliament of the United Kingdom disestablished in 1950
Politics of Aberdeenshire